The Sanjiang Plain includes the Amur River (also known as the Heilong, or literally, "Black Dragon" or River), Songhua and Ussuri (also known as the Wusuli) rivers and covers 23 counties in Heilongjiang Province, China encompassing about 109,000 km2. The area has extensive wetlands.

References

Plains of China
Landforms of Heilongjiang